Kranok pattern is one of the most important Thai motif patterns, because it appears in many Thai artworks such as Tripiṭaka cabinets, the doors of Thai temples, and coffins. According to the Royal Institute Dictionary in 1982, the definition of Kranok refers to a pattern of lines. However, when it is written as Kanok, it means gold. The pattern basically shows the repetition of right triangles. The triangles may be the same size or different sizes. Often the pointy part of the triangle goes right with each other in the same direction. In the Sanskrit language Kra-nok means thorns.

History

The origin of Lai Thai pattern
The Thai pattern is inspired from nature, for example;

 Lotus
 Jasmine
 Java Cassia
 Sea Iceland Cotton

The origin of Lai Kranok pattern

There are many types of Lai Kranok. The prototype of Lai Kranok is from the character of flame. Kranok Sam-Tua is the motif of other Kranok. In the past the ancient master prescribe another name which Kra-nok means birds and woods (Dong Nok Dong Mai) which they were created from the nature, can be spelled “Kor-Nok” but degenerate “O” vowel. Later on the next generation called “Kra-Nok”

Theory 
To study Thai art should practice by following the chapter or the procedure which was created by the ancient masters by starting from the group of Kranok pattern because Kranok or other pattern such as building, utensils, painting of characters in literary; monk, monkey, princess, giant. etc. to draw the eyebrow, mouth, ear, beard and any ornaments.

From the origin of Thai pattern the sacred lotus is the original of Kranok Sam-Tua, so before drawing we should know the components of Kranok which is very important e.g. drawing the notch and  the apex of Kranok.

The notch 
 The notch or bezel which called by the ancient master. The notch is dividing the distance of line around Kranok equally. To draw the notch has 2 ways;

 The notch in
The notch in has a character similar to the petal of the lotus bud. The petal line is bended into the flower. To bring the lotus petal to draw as the notch have to separately draw the end of the notch to far from each other. The distance of the depth is about a half of the notch.

 The notch out
The notch out has character similar to the petal of the lotus bloom. The petal line is bended from the flower. To bring the lotus petal to draw as the notch have to separately draw the end of the notch to far from each other. The distance of the depth is about a half of the notch. The notch out is same with the notch in, but opposite side.

The apex of Kranok 
The apex of Kranok is the most important. If Kranok body has the perfect proportion but the apex is too strong the Kranok will out of the beauty. The exemplar and inspiration of Kranok pattern is the flame. To draw the apex have to draw flutter and bland like a flame or a tail of eel.

Purpose 

The purpose of Thai pattern is to be used in religious institutions and the monarchy. The pattern are brought to decorate the buildings and utensils e.g. church, pavilion, palace, clothes, and ornaments. Including to the Thai acting such as making up the character and to decorate the scenes.

Types 
The Kranok pattern can be divided into many types, which include 
 Kranok Sam Thua (กระหนกสามตัว)
 Kranok Plaew (กระหนกเปลว)
 Kranok Bai Tet (กระหนกใบเทศ)
 Kranok Pak Kud (กระหนกผักกูด)
 Kranok Kor (กระหนกกอ)
 Kranok Hang-Hong (กระหนกหางหงส์)
 etc.
Kranok Sam Thua is the mother pattern of the all Kranok patterns as it the original design. Although different patterns exist, slight variations on design can be observed. Generally, the shape of the Kranok pattern originated from a lotus flower and derived from the appearance of the flame.

Designs 
To make the Kranok line look strong and lively, many artists draw the Yhuk  (หยัก) shape. It looks like a small triangle with a curve. Yhuk (หยัก) is located on the side of the triangle. The spaces between each Yuk (หยัก) must be even. The top part of the triangle in the Kranok pattern is called Yaud Kranok (ยอดกระหนก). One of the most famous Kranok artwork in Thailand is the Tripitaka cabinet (Thai: ตู้พระไตรปิฎก), which can be found in most of Buddhist temples in Thailand.

Kranok Pattern in Artworks 

The Kranok pattern can be used in many Thai designs. It is shown in general Thai artworks depending on the imagination of the artist. For example, in Thai painting and Thai carving, the delicate designs and gorgeous details are shown.

References 

Thai art